I Remember Warsaw is an album by Jimmy Sturr and His Orchestra. The album won Sturr a Grammy Award for Best Polka Recording at the 29th Annual Grammy Awards (1987).

See also
 Polka in the United States

References

1986 albums
Grammy Award for Best Polka Album
Jimmy Sturr albums